The 1981–82 Austrian Hockey League season was the 52nd season of the Austrian Hockey League, the top level of ice hockey in Austria. Eight teams participated in the league, and VEU Feldkirch won the championship.

First round

Final round

Relegation
ECS Innsbruck - WAT Stadlau 3:0 (6:5 OT, 4:2, 6:2)

WAT Stadlau avoided relegation as HC Salzburg folded due to bankruptcy.

External links
Austrian Ice Hockey Association

Austria
Austrian Hockey League seasons
League